David Henshaw (April 2, 1791 – November 11, 1852), son of Captain David Henshaw and Mary Sargent, was the 14th United States Secretary of the Navy.

Henshaw was born in Leicester, Massachusetts in 1791 and educated at Leicester Academy. Trained as a druggist, he achieved notable success in that field, then expanded his energies into banking, transportation and politics. Before he was 33 he had acquired means to become a banker and to establish an insurance company.  The panic of 1837 forced his "Commonwealth Bank' into bankruptcy. He was elected to the Massachusetts Senate in 1826 and served as Collector of the Port of Boston from the late 1820s until 1838. Though he suffered business reverses during the later 1830s, Henshaw regained his political position as a leader of the Massachusetts Democratic Party within a few years.

In July 1843, President John Tyler selected Henshaw as Secretary of the Navy to follow Abel P. Upshur. During his brief term in office, he addressed shipbuilding problems, selected senior officers for important seagoing commands, revised supply arrangements in the Navy Yards and attempted to establish a school for Midshipmen. Another accomplishment during his tenure was saving the USS Constitution from the scrap heap. His recess appointment as Secretary failed to receive Congressional confirmation, requiring that he leave office when his successor, Thomas W. Gilmer, was confirmed. (Gilmer was killed, after only nine days in office, by a canon explosion while firing a salute to a ship passing in review)  Henshaw then returned to Massachusetts politics.  After he left this post he dominated Democratic affairs in Massachusetts until the slavery issue began to disrupt parties. He died in 1852, buried Pine Grove Cemetery, Leicester, Massachusetts.

David was conservative, he was a capitalist, a Mason, an opponent of prohibition and a friend of slaveholders.  He read much and possessed a keen knowledge of men.  Although he never married, he dispensed a generous hospitality at his country home in Leicester. 

USS Henshaw (DD-278) was named in his honor.

See also
Unsuccessful nominations to the Cabinet of the United States
 47th Massachusetts General Court (1826–1827)

References
 Loring, James Spear. The Hundred Boston Orators Appointed by the Municipal Authorities from 1770 to 1852 David Henshaw Biographical Chapter - page 564. published 1852, 694 pages.
"Dictionary of American Biography", Charles Scribner's Sons and "American Secretaries of the Navy", Navy Institute Press.
"Twentieth Century Biographical Dictionary of Notable Americans", Johnson, Rossiter, ed.; The Biographical Society, 1904.
History of Henshaws in Scotland, in England and in America to the Present Time", Edith Henshaw Kuntz, 1956
"Genealogy of the Denny family in England and America", Denny, Christopher Columbus; Leicester, Massachusettes, 1886.

1791 births
1852 deaths
19th-century American politicians
Collectors of the Port of Boston
Leicester Academy alumni
Massachusetts state senators
People from Leicester, Massachusetts
Rejected or withdrawn nominees to the United States Executive Cabinet
Tyler administration cabinet members
United States Secretaries of the Navy